Michal Pšenko (born 8 July 1982) is a Slovak skier. He competed in the Nordic combined event at the 2002 Winter Olympics.

References

1982 births
Living people
Slovak male Nordic combined skiers
Olympic Nordic combined skiers of Slovakia
Nordic combined skiers at the 2002 Winter Olympics
Sportspeople from Poprad